James Bayliss (born 16 August 2000), is an Australian professional footballer who plays as a midfielder for Central Coast Mariners.

References

External links

2000 births
Living people
Australian soccer players
Association football midfielders
Central Coast Mariners FC players
National Premier Leagues players
A-League Men players